The Wonderful World of Julie London is an LP album by Julie London, released by Liberty Records under catalog number LRP-3324 as a monophonic recording and catalog number LST-7324 in stereo in November 1963. This was Julie London's final charting album, reaching #136 on the Billboard charts.

Ernie Freeman arranged and conducted the orchestra.

Track listing

Notes

References

Liberty Records albums
1963 albums
Julie London albums
Albums arranged by Ernie Freeman
Albums produced by Snuff Garrett